Đồng Tiến is the name of several places in Vietnam:

Đồng Tiến, Bắc Giang
Đồng Tiến, Bình Phước
Đồng Tiến, Hà Giang
Đồng Tiến, Hanoi
Đồng Tiến, Hòa Bình 
Đồng Tiến, Hưng Yên
Đồng Tiến, Lạng Sơn
Đồng Tiến, Quảng Ninh
Đồng Tiến, Thái Bình
Đồng Tiến, Thái Nguyên
Đồng Tiến, Thanh Hóa